Davy Klaassen (born 21 February 1993) is a Dutch professional footballer who plays as a midfielder for Eredivisie club Ajax and the Netherlands national team.

Club career

Early career
Klaassen began his football career in the youth ranks of local amateur side HVV de Zebra's, where he played until 2003, when he transferred to HSV Wasmeer. A year later he was recruited into the famed Ajax Youth Academy. While playing for the Ajax A1 youth squad in 2011–12, Klaassen helped his side to win the Nike Eredivisie league title, as well as finishing as runners-up to Inter Milan in the NextGen Series (the Champions League equivalent for under-19 teams) after losing on penalties (5–3) following a 1–1 deadlock after extra time.

Ajax
Klaassen made his debut for the first team in the UEFA Champions League group stage away draw (0–0) against Olympique Lyonnais on 22 November 2011 replacing Lorenzo Ebecilio in the 85th minute. While still competing in the A-Juniors Nike Eredivisie league competing for the Ajax A1 under-19 squad, he made his Eredivisie debut on 27 November as a substitute against NEC and scored only 42 seconds after having been subbed on. He made his debut in the starting XI of the Ajax first team on 11 December 2011, due to starting center midfielder Theo Janssen catching the flu. Klaassen played the entire match which ended in a 0–1 away win for Ajax against RKC Waalwijk.

On 5 August 2013, Klaassen made his debut in the Dutch Eerste Divisie in the 2–0 win against Telstar while playing for the newly promoted reserves team Jong Ajax, in what would be the first match in the 2nd tier of professional football ever for the reserves. He scored his first goal for Jong Ajax on 20 September 2013 in the 1–2 away victory against FC Eindhoven. On 6 October 2013, while playing for the Ajax first team, he scored his team's second goal in the 59th minute in the 3–0 home win against FC Utrecht. On 7 December 2013, Klaassen scored his first hat-trick while playing for the first team, in a 4–0 victory at home over NAC Breda, taking home the match ball and earning himself the Man of the Match award. Following the departure of Ajax captain Siem de Jong, Klaassen switched to the vacant number 10 shirt for the upcoming season.

For the 2015–16 season, Klaassen was named Ajax' captain, replacing the departed Niklas Moisander.

Everton
On 15 June 2017, Klaassen signed for Premier League side Everton on a five-year deal worth £23.6 million. He was handed the number 20 jersey at his new club for the 2017–18 season. He made his first official appearance for Everton in a 1–0 win over MFK Ružomberok in the UEFA Europa League third qualifying round first leg. Klaassen made his league debut for Everton on 12 August 2017, when his club beat Stoke City 1–0 at Goodison Park. 

Klaassen endured a difficult season with the club, falling out of favor with both Sam Allardyce and Marco Silva after Ronald Koeman was fired in October 2017. Between late September 2017 and early March 2018, he failed to make a Premier League appearance. At the end of the January transfer window, Klaassen neared a loan move to Napoli, although the move would never materialize. Allardyce claimed the deal collapsed as a result of an image rights dispute between Klaassen and the Italian club, although Klaassen would later reject this statement. Ahead of his summer move to Werder Bremen, Klaassen expressed his desire to prove his worth for the following season. Klaassen stated that he struggled to adapt to the different style of play in the Premier League, hence his struggles with the club.

Werder Bremen
On 27 July 2018, Klaassen joined Werder Bremen on a four-year deal while the transfer fee paid to Everton was reported as €13.5 million (£12 million).

Return to Ajax
On 5 October 2020, Klaassen rejoined Ajax on a contract until 30 June 2024, with a transfer fee which could rise to €14 million.

International career

Youth
Klaassen made his debut for the Dutch national team at youth levels, debuting for the Netherlands U-16 team on 28 October 2008 in the 10th edition of the Tournoi Val de Marne '08 in the 3–0 victory over Italy U-16, while scoring the second goal for the Netherlands in his first international encounter. Klaassen scored in his second appearance for the Netherlands U-16 in the same tournament as well in 0–1 win over France U-16. In total Klaassen made 5 appearances for the Netherlands U-16 while scoring 4 goals. Scoring two more goals in friendly encounters against Ukraine U-16 and Ireland U-16 as well. On 22 September 2009, Klaassen made his first appearance for the Netherlands U17 team in a friendly encounter against France U17 which ended in a 1–0 loss for the Dutch. On 3 March 2010, he scored his first goal for the under-17 side in his 8th appearance, a friendly match against Greece U17. He also played a major role in the Netherlands qualifying campaign ahead of the 2010 UEFA European Under-17 Football Championship as well as playing in the 2009 edition of La Manga Cup. On 2 September 2010, Klaassen made his debut for the Netherlands U19 team in a friendly match against Germany U19 which ended in a 2–2 draw. In his 7th appearance for the under-19 side he scored both his first and second goal on 10 November 2011 in a qualification match ahead of the 2012 UEFA European Under-19 Championship against Moldova U19 with the Netherlands failing to qualify for the final tournament in Estonia.

Due to injuries sustained by Ruben Ligeon, Yassin Ayoub and Jürgen Locadia for the Netherlands U21 selection, Klaassen received his first call-up for Jong Oranje the under-21 selection of the Netherlands as a replacement along with Thomas Bruns and Timo Letschert for the 2015 UEFA European Under-21 Football Championship qualification match against Georgia U21, as well as the friendly match against Austria U21 four days later. He made his debut for the under-21 side on 10 October 2013 in that qualification match helping the Dutch to defeat Georgia 6–0 in which he replaced Luc Castaignos in the 81st minute of the match.

Senior
On 5 March 2014, Klaassen made his debut for the Netherlands first team under head coach Louis van Gaal at the Stade de France in Paris, in a friendly match against France ahead of the 2014 FIFA World Cup. He was substituted on in the 72nd minute for Wesley Sneijder, as the Netherlands lost the match 2–0 to the French. While making his debut for the Netherlands, Klaassen became the 100th Ajax player in the history of the club to make his debut for the Dutch national team while playing his club football at Ajax.

On 31 March 2015, Klaassen scored his first international goal and the team's second goal in a 2–0 win over Spain in a friendly match.

Style of play
Klaassen's nickname is "cheese straw" (Dutch: kaasstengel) due to his physical appearance. Another nickname is "Mister 1-0" due to him often scoring the first goal of a match. On the signing of the former Ajax captain, then Everton manager Ronald Koeman was quoted saying Klaassen was a leader on the pitch. Koeman further described Klaassen's playing style as hardworking, liked to press and would provide creativity and goals.

Career statistics

Club

International

Scores and results list the Netherlands' goal tally first, score column indicates score after each Klaassen goal.

Honours
Ajax
 Eredivisie: 2011–12, 2012–13, 2013–14, 2020–21, 2021–22
 KNVB Cup: 2020–21
Johan Cruyff Shield: 2013
 UEFA Europa League: runner-up 2016–17

Individual
 Best player of AEGON Future Cup: 2010
 Ajax Talent of the Future (Sjaak Swart Award): 2010–11
 Hilversum Sportsman of the Year: 2013
 Ajax Talent of the Year (Marco van Basten Award): 2013–14
 Johan Cruijff Award: 2014
Dutch Footballer of the Year: 2016
Eredivisie Player of the Month: November 2020, April 2022

References

External links

 Profile at the AFC Ajax website
 Davy Klaassen at Voetbal International 
 Netherlands U16 stats at OnsOranje
 Netherlands U17 stats at OnsOranje
 Netherlands U19 stats at OnsOranje
 Netherlands U21 stats at OnsOranje
 
 

1993 births
Living people
Sportspeople from Hilversum
Association football midfielders
Dutch footballers
AFC Ajax players
Jong Ajax players
Everton F.C. players
SV Werder Bremen players
Eredivisie players
Eerste Divisie players
Premier League players
Bundesliga players
Netherlands youth international footballers
Netherlands under-21 international footballers
Netherlands international footballers
UEFA Euro 2020 players
2022 FIFA World Cup players
Dutch expatriate footballers
Dutch expatriate sportspeople in England
Dutch expatriate sportspeople in Germany
Expatriate footballers in England
Expatriate footballers in Germany
Footballers from North Holland